Egyptian Sudan may refer to:
 Turkish Sudan (1820–1885), Sudan administered by Egypt under nominal Ottoman sovereignty
 Anglo-Egyptian Sudan (1899–1956), Sudan as a condominium between Egypt and the United Kingdom

See also
 History of Sudan, for other polities with Egyptian elements